English Language and Linguistics is a peer-reviewed academic journal covering  linguistics and published three times a year by Cambridge University Press.

References

Linguistics journals
Publications established in 1997
Biannual journals
English-language journals
Cambridge University Press academic journals
1997 establishments in the United Kingdom